Drinkin' Songs and Other Logic is a 2005 (see 2005 in music) album by country singer Clint Black. He describes it as a "barroom, honky-tonk kind of album" with songs "about drinking, good for drinking, or written while drinking". The tracks "Rainbow in the Rain", "Code of the West", "Drinkin' Songs and Other Logic" and "Heartaches" were all released as singles. Kimberly Roads and Jimi Westbrook of the group Little Big Town are featured on this album as background vocalists.

Track listing 
All songs written by Clint Black and Hayden Nicholas except where noted.

Personnel

Band 

Clint Black — acoustic guitar, harmonica, percussion, electric guitar, lead vocals, background vocals
Dane Bryant — piano, background vocals, Fender Rhodes
Dick Gay — drums
Hayden Nicholas — electric guitar, baritone guitar
Jeff Peterson — Dobro, steel guitar
Steve Real — background vocals
Kimberly Roads — background vocals
Steve Wariner — electric guitar
Jimi Westbrook — background vocals
Jake Willemain — bass guitar
Martin Young — acoustic guitar

Production 
Clint Black — producer
Zack Berry — production coordinator
Ricky Cobble — engineer, mixing
Ray Rogers — engineering support
Steve Lockhart — technical support
Hank Williams — mastering

Chart positions 

From Billboard.

Album

Singles

References 

Black Tracks: Drinkin' Songs and Other Logic. ClintBlack.com. Retrieved on January 5, 2007.
[ Drinkin' Songs and Other Logic Overview]. Allmusic. Retrieved on January 3, 2007.
[ Drinkin' Songs and Other Logic Credits]. Allmusic. Retrieved on January 5, 2007.
[ Artist Chart History (Singles)]. Billboard. Retrieved on January 3, 2007.
[ Artist Chart History (Albums)]. Billboard. Retrieved on January 3, 2007.

2005 albums
Clint Black albums
Equity Music Group albums
Albums produced by Clint Black